Jamkhandi Assembly seat is one of 224 assembly constituencies in Karnataka State, in India. It is part of Bagalkot (Lok Sabha constituency).

Members of Legislative Assembly 
Source

^ denotes by-poll

Election results

Also see
List of constituencies of the Karnataka Legislative Assembly

References

Assembly constituencies of Karnataka
Bagalkot district